Taban Air serves the following destinations (as of September 2022)

Destinations

References

Lists of airline destinations
Taban Air